The 650s decade ran from January 1, 650, to December 31, 659.

Significant people
 Popes: Martin I, Eugene I, Vitalian
 Byzantine Emperor: Constans II

References

Sources